Jan Rompski (8 December 1913 – 30 December 1969; Kashubian: Jón Rómpsczi) was a Kashubian activist,  poet, writer, journalist  and ethnographer. He was one of the most important people in the organization  "Zrzeszyńce". During World War II he belonged to the secret anti-Nazi organization Pomeranian Griffin (Krëjamnô Wòjskòwô Òrganizacëjô "Pòmòrsczi Grif"). He was imprisoned in a concentration camp Stutthof. After the war he finished his studies (Nicolaus Copernicus University in Toruń) and was strongly involved in Kashubian movement.

Bibliography
"Kiej"
"Vzenjik Arkonë"
"Reboce"
"Za zemjã" (1956)
"Pòrénk" (1957),
"Roztrąbarch" (1958),
"Lepszé checze" (1958)
"Gãsy ùd" (1959)
"Scynanié kanië" (1961)
"Pomión zwonów" (1970)
"Ścinanie kani. Kaszubski zwyczaj ludowy" (1973)
"Wiérzte" (1980)

Sources 
L. Bądkowski: Zarys historii literatury kaszubskiej, Gdańsk 1959, 2006.
G. Stone: Slav outposts in Central European history : the Wends, Sorbs and Kashubs, London, UK : Bloomsbury Academic, an imprint of Bloomsbury Publishing Plc, 2016.
J. Kurowska i in.: Katalog rękopisów Muzeum Piśmiennictwa i Muzyki Kaszubsko-Pomorskiej w Wejherowie, tom I. Spuścizna Jana Rompskiego, Wejherowo 2005.
F. Neureiter: Geschichte der Kaschubischen Literatur. Versuch einer Zusammenfassenden Darstellung’’, Otto Sagner Verlag München 1991 (Jan Rompski pp. 178–185).
F. Neureiter: Historia literatury kaszubskiej. Próba zarysu, Wydawnictwo Morskie, Gdańsk 1982 - 
R. Osowicka: Leksykon wejherowian, Wejherowo 2008 (short biography).

Kashubians
Kashubian poets
Kashubian literature
1969 deaths
1913 births
Stutthof concentration camp survivors
People from Kartuzy
20th-century Polish poets
Nicolaus Copernicus University in Toruń alumni